(1912–1978) was a Japanese vertebrate palaeontologist. Considered the leading Japanese figure in the field in the immediate pre- and post-war years, species he described include Yabe's giant deer (Sinomegaceros yabei).

References

External links
 Shikama Tokio (Japan Paleobiology Database)

Japanese paleontologists
1912 births
1978 deaths